Zaporizhzhia Arch Bridge is the longest arch bridge in Ukraine. The bridge connects the west bank area of Zaporizhzhia with the north side of Khortytsia Island by spanning the smaller eastern branch of the River Dnieper.

History
In 1970 the construction of the DniproHES-2 hydroelectric plant began. The plans called for the project to take 10 years. When at full pace, the movement of construction materials from the Khortytskyi District of Zaporizhzhia on the west bank of the Dnipner, to the construction site, would produce too much traffic for the temporary bridge, built after World War II, to handle. In addition, during the construction of DniproHES-2, the road on top of the dam would be blocked, which would also increase the traffic on the temporary bridge. 

For these reasons, architectural and engineering plans were drawn up for a new permanent bridge. The new bridge would span from the western bank of the Dnieper to the northern side of the mid-river island Khortytsia. It would provide access to the Preobrazhensky Bridge near the southeast end of the island, which crossed the wider east channel of the Dnieper. 

Construction began in 1970 and took until 1974 to complete. It began on the west bank in the Khortytskyi District. The construction contractor was a trust, the Urban Development Office of the Upper-Dnieper basin of the Ministry of Transport Construction of the USSR.

The bridge is a single-arch, steel frame. The steel frame was produced at the Dnieper Steel Frame Factory. The assembly and installation were conducted by the Construction Bridge Brigade #12, led by Precinct Chief Zalyubovsky. By 1973 the Bridge Brigade had assembled, and installed, over 200 tonnes of the steel frame. 

The Zaporizhzhia Arch Bridge was the first Soviet bridge to be constructed by fully assembling the deck truss on barges, and on the two river banks. Then the -long steel-truss was hoisted into place atop the arch as a single unit.

Upon completion of installation, testing of the bridge's load-bearing structures began. Testing was conducted by a staff of the Bridge Dynamics Laboratory of the Dnipropetrovsk Institute of Transport Engineers (today part of the Dnieper National University of Rail Transport). The bridge span over the arch above the river was tested first. Then the two portions on either bank, not above the arch, were tested. The tests consisted of 50 dump trucks, each loaded to weigh 25 tonnes, and driven into place one at a time until the full test load of 1,250 tonnes was achieved. Monitoring gauges were installed on elements of the steel structure to measure, and record, the load values, and the deformation of the elements.

See also
 Bridges in Kyiv

References

External links
 Adelberg, L. Bridges of Zaporizhzhia (Мосты Запорожья). "Tandem-U". Zaporizhzhia, 2005

Bridges in Zaporizhzhia
Bridges completed in 1974
Road bridges in Zaporizhzhia
Bridges over the Dnieper
Buildings and structures in Zaporizhzhia
Arch bridges in Ukraine
1974 establishments in Ukraine